Hillhead is an unincorporated community in Marshall County, in the U.S. state of South Dakota.

History
An early variant name was Airmount. A post office called Airmount was established in 1916, the name was changed to Hillhead in 1917, and the post office closed in 1960.

References

Unincorporated communities in Marshall County, South Dakota
Unincorporated communities in South Dakota